The following is a list of works by Japanese anime director, storyboard artist, writer, and animator Akiyuki Shinbo. The page is divided into sections for his work as a series/film director, his involvement with other productions in a smaller role (i.e. key animator), and his books. These sections are further divided by format: television series, original video animations, original net animations, and films.

For some of his works, Shinbo has used various pseudonyms, not all of which are likely known. The current list of known Shinbo pseudonyms is as follows: Jūhachi Minamizawa, Futoshi Shiiya, Sōji Homura, and Satoko Shindō. Much of his work also tends to be completely uncredited, in particular for storyboarding and episode directing duties that he performs on his own series. For these reasons, the full extent of Shinbo's work across the industry, and even his own works, is not known.

Works
 Highlights roles with series or film directorial duties. In cases where Shinbo was not in such a position, the "Director(s)/Co-director(s)" parameter is reserved for the director(s) of the work. In cases where Shinbo shares the position with another director, only the other director will be listed in the row, with Shinbo's credit highlighted and listed in the "Credit(s)" row. If Shinbo is the sole director, the former will remain blank. Highlights roles with supervising duties.

Television series

OVAs

ONAs

Films

Music videos

Video games

Book supervisor

Notes

General

Director credits

Works cited

References

External links
 
 
 Akiyuki Shinbo anime works in Media Arts Database 

Shinbo, Akiyuki
Japanese filmographies